RWL may refer to:

 Revolutionary Workers League (Oehlerite)
 Revolutionary Workers League (in Manitoba)
 Revolutionary Workers League/Ligue Ouvrière Révolutionnaire
 Revolutionary Workers League (U.S.)